Desi Justice "D. J." Carton (born August 5, 2000) is an American professional basketball player for the Iowa Wolves of the NBA G League. He played college basketball for the Ohio State Buckeyes and the Marquette Golden Eagles.

Early life and high school career
Growing up, Carton's family moved several times before settling in Geneseo, Illinois. While living in Geneseo he attended St. Malachy Catholic School, and also went to the Geneseo Middle School. He excelled at baseball and could throw 75 miles an hour by seventh grade. He also played running back on the football team, but a rotator cuff injury forced him to concentrate on basketball. Carton moved to Bettendorf, Iowa after eight grade and he attended Bettendorf High School, where he became a starter on the basketball team as a sophomore. As a junior, he was a first-team all-state pick, averaging a school-record 26.3 points per game to go with 5.7 rebounds and 3.3 assists per game. He scored 49 points against Davenport West High School during his senior season. Carton led the Bulldogs to a 21–2 season and the top of the Class 4A state rankings before they fell to Dubuque Senior High School in the state Sweet 16 despite 27 points from Carton. As a senior, Carton averaged 24.4 points, 7.6 rebounds and 6.0 assists per game. Carton finished his career as the all-time leading scorer with 1,198 points and was among the school's all-time leaders in rebounds (372) and assists (257). He was named Co-Iowa Mr. Basketball in 2019, alongside Jake Hilmer. In AAU play, Carton competed for the Iowa Barnstormers before joining the Quad City Elite.

Recruiting
Ranked the 34th best player in his class and a four-star recruit, Carton committed to Ohio State on July 14, 2018, over offers from Indiana, Michigan, Iowa, Marquette and Xavier, among others.

College career
Carton was named the Big Ten preseason freshman of the year, but Florida State transfer CJ Walker started ahead of him at point guard to begin the season. Carton scored a season-high 19 points on December 15, 2019, in a 84–71 loss to Minnesota. On January 26, 2020, Carton scored 17 points and had three assists in a win over Northwestern. He decided to take a leave of absence from the team on January 30, citing mental health issues. Carton averaged 10.4 points and 3.0 assists per game as a freshman, shooting 40% from 3-point range. Following the season, he opted to transfer from Ohio State.

On April 15, 2020, Carton committed to continue his career at Marquette. He was granted immediate eligibility by the NCAA. Carton averaged 13 points, 4.1 rebounds and 3.4 assists per game. After the season, he announced he was entering the 2021 NBA draft and hiring an agent.

Professional career

Greensboro Swarm (2021–2022)
After going undrafted in the 2021 NBA draft, Carton signed a contract with the Charlotte Hornets on August 7, 2021. However, he was waived on October 8. On October 24, he signed with the Greensboro Swarm as an affiliate player.

Iowa Wolves (2022–present)
On November 2, 2022, Carton was named to the opening night roster for the Iowa Wolves.

Career statistics

College

|-
| style="text-align:left;"| 2019–20
| style="text-align:left;"| Ohio State
| 20 || 3 || 23.9 || .477 || .400 || .759 || 2.8 || 3.0 || .7 || .4 || 10.4
|-
| style="text-align:left;"| 2020–21
| style="text-align:left;"| Marquette
| 27 || 24 || 31.1 || .446 || .282 || .743 || 4.1 || 3.4 || 1.1 || .4 || 13.0
|- class="sortbottom"
| style="text-align:center;" colspan="2"| Career
| 47 || 27 || 28.0 || .457 || .322 || .748 || 3.5 || 3.2 || .9 || .4 || 11.9

Personal life
Carton was born in Pineville, North Carolina. Carton's mother Jennifer played volleyball at the University of Colorado. His father Desi Wilson played basketball and baseball at Fairleigh Dickinson University before being selected in the 1991 Major League Baseball draft by the Texas Rangers and enjoying a short career with the San Francisco Giants. His maternal grandfather Gene Meeker played basketball at the University of Iowa during the 1950s. Carton has not seen his father since the age of four. When his mother married Dale Carton, he changed his name from Desi Junior Wilson to Desi Justice Carton.

References

External links
Marquette Golden Eagles bio
Ohio State Buckeyes bio
USA Basketball bio

2000 births
Living people
American men's basketball players
Basketball players from Iowa
Bettendorf High School alumni
Greensboro Swarm players
Iowa Wolves players
Marquette Golden Eagles men's basketball players
Ohio State Buckeyes men's basketball players
People from Bettendorf, Iowa
Point guards